Kalakala may refer to:
 Kalantaka or Kalakala, aspect of the Hindu god Shiva as destroyer of Death
 MV Kalakala, a US car ferry